Robert Bolton (1572–1631) was an English clergyman, academic and preacher.

Robert Bolton may also refer to:
 Robert Bolton (Dean of Carlisle) (1697–1763), English churchman
 Bertie Bolton (Robert Henry Dundas Bolton, 1893–1964), Indian Army and British Army officer, police officer and English cricketer
 Robert Bolton (MP) for Derby
Robert Bolton (politician), Unionist